The Online Film Critics Society Award for Best Cinematography is an annual film award given by the Online Film Critics Society to honor the best cinematography of the year.

Winners

1990s

2000s

2010s

2020s

References

Awards for best cinematography